King Biscuit Flower Hour Presents Girlschool is a live album by British heavy metal band Girlschool, released by King Biscuit Flower Hour Records in 1997. It was recorded during the 1984 Play Dirty USA tour. Kelly Johnson  would leave the band soon thereafter. The album was reissued through Disky Records on 6 June 2002 with the title Race with the Devil and with the running order changed.

Track listing

Personnel
Kim McAulliffe – vocals, guitar
Kelly Johnson – lead guitar, vocals
Gil Weston – bass, vocals
Denise Dufort – drums

References

External links
Official Girlschool discography

Girlschool live albums
1997 live albums